Katelyn T. Kuttab is an American politician. She is a Republican member of the New Hampshire House of Representatives. She represents Rockingham District 17, which consists of the town of Windham. She was first elected on November 8, 2022.

References 

New Hampshire Republicans
1986 births
Living people